Esgenoôpetitj (2016 population: 1,079) is a Mi'kmaq Indian reserve in Northumberland County, New Brunswick, Canada. Prior to July 11, 2012, the Indian reserve was named Burnt Church 14.

It belongs to the Burnt Church First Nation, of whom about two-thirds of the population live on reserve.

The reserve is located on Miramichi Bay, near the mouth of the Miramichi River.

Demographics

Population trend

Mother tongue (2016)

See also
List of communities in New Brunswick

References

2001 Aboriginal Profile from Statistics Canada
info page at Indian and Northern Affairs Canada website

Indian reserves in New Brunswick
Geography of Northumberland County, New Brunswick
Mi'kmaq in Canada